Now Bonyad-e Gonbadli (also Romanized as Now Bonyād-e Gonbadlī; also known as Now Bonyād) is a village in Khangiran Rural District, in the Central District of Sarakhs County, Razavi Khorasan Province, Iran. At the 2006 census, its population was 501, in 123 families.

References 

Populated places in Sarakhs County